Crocus yakarianus is a species of flowering plant in the genus Crocus of the family Iridaceae. It is a cormous perennial native to Turkey (Malataya).

References

yakarianus